Alisma orientale, commonly known as Asian water plantain, is a flowering plant species in the genus Alisma found in Asia.

Alisma orientale is sometimes treated as a variety of Alisma plantago-aquatica (Alisma plantago-aquatica var. orientale).  The rhizomes of A. orientale have been used as a traditional Chinese medicine, ze xie.  However, it may have serious side effects or even toxic effects such as hepatotoxicity. The rhizome of the plant is also a herb used in kampo Japanese medicine.

The seed contains cis-aconitic anhydride ethyl ester and cis-2,4,5-trihydroxycinnamic acid.

References 

 Flora U.R.S.S. 1:281. 1933

External links 

 

orientale
Freshwater plants
Flora of China
Flora of Japan
Plants used in traditional Chinese medicine
Plants described in 1933